Swami Prasad Maurya (born 2 January 1954) is an Indian politician and was a member of  the 17th Legislative Assembly of Uttar Pradesh of India. He represented the Padrauna constituency of Uttar Pradesh. He is a member of Samajwadi Party.

Maurya has been a Member of the legislative assembly for five terms, has been minister in the government of Uttar Pradesh, Leader of the house and Leader of opposition. He was serving as Cabinet Minister for Labour, Employment and Co-ordination in Yogi Adityanath ministry. Until 2021, he was a member of  the Bharatiya Janata Party which he joined after a long stint with Bahujan Samaj Party.

Early life and education
Swami Prasad Maurya was born on 2 January 1954 in a family of Chakwadh, Pratapgarh, Uttar Pradesh to Badlu Maurya and Jagannathi Maurya. He is married to Shiva Maurya, with whom he has a son and a daughter. His daughter, Sanghmitra Maurya is a Member of Parliament, Lok Sabha from Budaun.  He attended the  Allahabad University and attained Bachelor of Laws and Master of Arts degrees.

Political career
Maurya has been a MLA for five terms. He represented the Padrauna constituency and was a member of the Bhartiya Janta Party political party. He was previously a member of Bahujan Samaj Party and was elected in the assembly as a member of BSP. On 22 June 2016, Maurya resigned from all party posts alleging "money for ticket" syndicate being run by the party, this claim was later denied by the BSP supremo Mayawati in a press conference on the same day, where she thanked Maurya for doing courtesy on the party for leaving on his own, otherwise he was about to be expelled for promoting dynastic politics within BSP.

In July 2016, Maurya announced that the formation of his organisational unit called Loktantrik Bahujan Manch which launched at Lucknow’s Ramabai Ambedkar Rally Ground.

In March 2017, he is appointed as Cabinet Minister in Uttar Pradesh Government. He go ministries of Labour and Employment exchanges, Urban employment and Poverty alleviation in Yogi Adityanath ministry.

On 21 August 2019, after first cabinet expansion of Yogi Adityanath his ministry department changed as Minister of Labour, Employment, Co-ordination.

On 11 January 2022, Swami gave a huge setback to Bhartiya Janta Party (BJP), by resigning from the post of cabinet minister of the Yogi Adityanath ministry and as well as from BJP just a month before the assembly elections. He said that BJP has done injustice to almost all sections of society, such as, why he resigned. BJP claims that he resigned since he was told that his son will not get a Member of the Legislative Assembly (MLA) ticket from BJP for the upcoming 2022 Uttar Pradesh Legislative Assembly election.

Maurya joined Samajwadi Party in January 2022, but was denied ticket from his stronghold Padrauna, instead was asked to fight from Fazilnagar, which he subsequently lost in the 2022 Uttar Pradesh Legislative Assembly election against BJP's Surendra Kumar Kushwaha.

Posts held

Personal life 
Maurya is a Buddhist and an Ambedkarite, follower of B. R. Ambedkar. His daughter, Sanghmitra Maurya, was elected to Lok Sabha in 2019 General Elections, while his son Utkrisht Maurya is also a politician who unsuccessfully contested Assembly elections twice from Unchahar Raebareli.

Controversies 
Swami Prasad Maurya had alleged about some verses of the Hindu religious text Ramcharitmanas that the Shudra caste has been degraded in it. He said that such verses should be banned and he would burn the book on which Ramcharitmanas was burnt by his supporters, he was lashed by all the Hindu organisations, as well as VHP burnt his effigy and also demand to arrest him for sacrilege of Ramcharitmanas. For his coarseness towards Ramcharitmanas he was promoted to General Secretary of Samajwadi Party by Akhilesh Yadav.  When the dissent erupted the Party distanced itself from Maurya saying that were personal remarks of and has nothing to relate with the party.  VHP also demanded the Election Commission of India to de-list Samajwadi Party and lodged an FIR against him. 

In February 2023, after the Ramcharitmanas controversy, the supporters of Maurya heckled Mahant Rajudas, a priest who had announced a bounty of 21 lakh on Maurya's head earlier. In the allegations and counter-allegations, which led to exchange of blows between the priests and Maurya's supporters, Rajudas stated that the supporters of Maurya called him "Saffron Terrorist". While Maurya accused Mahant Rajudas of plotting to kill him. He also charged allegations upon them of keeping deadly weapons and attacking him, to which, his supporters gave befitting reply.

Maurya was also criticised by some of the leaders of Samajwadi Party itself, because of his stand on the Ramcharitmanas. However, the party in a press note released latter, announced the expulsion of those leaders from the SP, who criticized Maurya. These leaders included two women veterans of party, Richa Singh and Roli Tiwari Mishra.

See also
Dinanath Bhaskar
Sixteenth Legislative Assembly of Uttar Pradesh
Uttar Pradesh Legislative Assembly

References 

Former members of Bahujan Samaj Party
Former members of Bharatiya Janata Party from Uttar Pradesh
Janata Dal politicians
Bharatiya Lok Dal politicians
Uttar Pradesh MLAs 1997–2002
Uttar Pradesh MLAs 2002–2007
Uttar Pradesh MLAs 2007–2012
Uttar Pradesh MLAs 2012–2017
Uttar Pradesh MLAs 2017–2022
University of Allahabad alumni
People from Pratapgarh district, Uttar Pradesh
1954 births
Living people
Leaders of the Opposition in the Uttar Pradesh Legislative Assembly
Yogi ministry
21st-century Buddhists
Indian Buddhists
Indian former Hindus
Converts to Buddhism from Hinduism
Dalit politicians